Rudolf Litsch (born 4 August 1944) is an Austrian weightlifter. He competed in the men's middle heavyweight event at the 1972 Summer Olympics.

References

1944 births
Living people
Austrian male weightlifters
Olympic weightlifters of Austria
Weightlifters at the 1972 Summer Olympics
Place of birth missing (living people)